Bodies of water of brackish nature are found around the world in a wide variety of settings, shapes and sizes. The following is a list of notable bodies of brackish water.

Brackish seas

 Baltic Sea (the world’s largest inland brackish sea)
 Black Sea
 Hudson Bay and James Bay
 Salish Sea
 Ariake Sea

Brackish lakes

Africa
 Lake Turkana in Kenya and Ethiopia

Americas
 Bras d'Or Lake on Cape Breton Island in Nova Scotia, Canada
 Laguna de Oviedo in the Dominican Republic
 Lake Charles in Lake Charles, Louisiana, United States
 Lake Manitoba in Manitoba, Canada
 Lake Maracaibo in Zulia State, Venezuela
 Lake Monroe in Florida, United States
 Lake Texoma on the border between Oklahoma and Texas, United States

Asia
 Caspian Sea
 Issyk Kul in Kyrgyzstan
 Pangong Tso Ladakh, India
 Lake Van, in eastern Turkey
 Lake Shinji in Japan
 Lake Hamana in Japan
 Lake Saroma in Japan
 Chilika Lake in India

Europe
 Loch of Stenness in Scotland
 Lake Mogil'noe on Kildin Island, north of Murmansk, Russia
 Lake Vouliagmeni located south of Athens, Vouliagmeni, Greece

Tidal lagoons, marshes, and deltas

Africa
 Lagos Lagoon in Lagos, Nigeria
 Lake Burullus in the Nile Delta, Egypt

Americas
 Barnegat Bay in New Jersey, United States
 Budi Lake in Araucanía, Chile
 Indian River Lagoon in Florida, United States
 Lagoa dos Patos in Rio Grande do Sul state, Brazil
 Laguna de Términos in Campeche, Mexico
 Lake Pontchartrain in Louisiana, United States
 Simpson Bay Lagoon on the island of Saint Martin
 Rodeo Lagoon in Marin County, California

Asia
 Chilika Lake in Odisha, India
 Kaliveli Lake in Tamil Nadu, India
 The Kerala Backwaters, a series of lagoons and lakes in Kerala, India
 Muthupet Lagoon in Tamil Nadu, India
 Pulicat Lake in Andhra Pradesh, India
 The Rann of Kutch between Gujarat, India and Sindh, Pakistan

Europe
 The Burgas Lakes near the Bulgarian Black Sea Coast
 The Fleet lagoon in Dorset, England
 Loch Etive in Scotland
 Loch Long in Scotland
 Parts of the Rhône Delta, France: an area known as the Camargue
 Widewater, a land-locked lagoon near Lancing, England

Oceania
 Kiritimati Lagoon in Kiribati
 Lake Ellesmere / Te Waihora in Canterbury, New Zealand

Estuaries

 Amazon River, empties so much freshwater into the Atlantic Ocean that it reduces the salinity of the sea for hundreds of kilometres
 Chesapeake Bay in Maryland and Virginia. It is the drowned river valley of the Susquehanna River. It is the largest estuary in the United States.
 Delaware Bay, an extension of the Delaware River in New Jersey and Delaware, the United States
 Great Bay, an extension of the Piscataqua River in Portsmouth, New Hampshire, United States
 The Lower Hudson River in New York and New Jersey, the United States
 East River and Harlem River in New York, the United States
 Lingding Yang, Guangdong, China
 Miramichi River, New Brunswick, Canada
 Mobile Bay, Alabama, United States (also the only known place in the world where jubilees regularly occur [see Mobile Bay Jubilee])
 Port Royal Sound part of Beaufort County, South Carolina, United States, The Lowcountry Estuarium – Estuary, Marsh, & Creek Life – South Carolina Coast
 Ringkøbing Fjord in Midtjylland, Denmark
 Río de la Plata in Argentina and Uruguay.
 Saint Lawrence and Saguenay Rivers, the part downstream from Quebec City and Saguenay respectively, Canada
 San Francisco Bay and San Pablo Bay adjacent to San Francisco in California, United States
 The Thames Estuary in South East England, United Kingdom
 The Reversing Falls of the Saint John River, Saint John, New Brunswick, Canada.

See also
List of bodies of water by salinity

References

Brackish